A launch service provider (LSP) is a type of company which specialises in launching spacecraft.  In 2018, the launch services sector accounted for $5.5 billion out of a total $344.5 billion "global space economy". It is responsible for the ordering, conversion or construction of the carrier rocket, assembly and stacking, payload integration, and ultimately conducting the launch itself. Some of these tasks may be delegated or sub-contracted to other companies. For example, United Launch Alliance has formally subcontracted the production of GEM solid rocket motors for their Delta II and Delta IV (Medium version) rockets to Alliant Techsystems, both vehicles are now retired. An LSP does not necessarily build all the rockets it launches.

A document central to successful launch service provision is the Interface Control Document (ICD), a contract that specifies the integration and mission requirements responsibilities across the service provider and the service solicitor.

In some cases, an LSP is not required to launch a rocket. Government organizations such as the military and defense forces may conduct the launch themselves.

List of active launch service providers

Corporate 
 Antrix Corporation (India)
 Arianespace (France)
 Astra (United States)
 Blue Origin (United States)
 CAS Space (China)
 Eurockot Launch Services (Germany)
 Firefly Aerospace (United States)
 GK Launch Services (Russia, Ukraine, Kazakhstan)
 International Launch Services aka ILS (United States)
 ISC Kosmotras (Russia)
 LinkSpace (China)
 Mitsubishi Heavy Industries via MHI Launch Services (Japan)
 Northrop Grumman Space Systems Group (United States)
 HyImpulse (Germany)
 OneSpace (China)
 PLD Space (Spain)
 Rocket Factory Augsburg (Germany)
 Rocket Lab (United States/New Zealand)
 Sea Launch (Switzerland)
 Space Services Inc. (United States)
 SpaceX (United States)
 Spaceflight Industries (United States)
 Starsem (France)
 United Launch Alliance aka ULA (United States)
 Vector Launch (United States)
 Virgin Orbit (United States)
 Zero 2 Infinity (Spain)

Former Corporate 

 Orbital ATK (United States)
 Orbital Sciences Corporation (United States)
 Stratolaunch Systems (United States)

Governmental and State-owned 

 DARPA (United States)
 ExPace (China)
 Glavkosmos (Russia)
 ISA (Iran)
 JAXA (Japan)
 NADA (North Korea)
 NASA (United States)

List of defunct launch service providers

 American Rocket Company (United States)
 E'Prime Aerospace (United States)
 Energia (Russia, marketed in USA via branch company Energia Group. Company is still active, but not as a launch provider)
 LTV Aerospace (United States)
 Martin Marietta (United States)
 OSC/Hercules (United States, former JV between OSC and Hercules Aerospace selling Pegasus)
 OTRAG (Germany)

References

Commercial spaceflight
Rocketry